The 2023 Texas Longhorns softball team represents the University of Texas at Austin during the 2023 NCAA Division I softball season. 
The Longhorns play their home games at Red and Charline McCombs Field as a member of the Big 12 Conference. 
They are led by head coach Mike White in his 5th season at Texas.

Previous Season
Texas finished the 2022 season 47–22–1, 12–6 in Big 12 Conference play. Texas also was the first unseeded team to ever reach the Women's College World Series finals.

Big 12 Tournament
Bracket

Fayetteville Super Regional

Women's College World Series

Personnel

Roster

Roster Notes

Coaches

Support Staff

Offseason

Player Departures

Outgoing Transfers

Coaching Staff Departures

Incoming Players 

Incoming Transfers

Coaching Staff Additions

Preseason

Award watch lists 
Listed in the order that they were released

Big 12 media poll

Source:

Preseason All-Big 12 team

Schedule and results

Schedule Notes

Statistics
All Statastics through March 20, 2023

Team batting

Team pitching

Individual batting
Note: leaders must meet the minimum requirement of 2 PA/G and 75% of games played

Individual pitching
Note: leaders must meet the minimum requirement of 1 IP/G

Source:

Rankings

References

Texas Longhorns softball seasons
Texas Longhorns
Texas